Samuel Cochran Mims V (born April 2, 1972) is an American politician. He is a member of the Mississippi House of Representatives from the 97th District, being first elected in 2003. He is a member of the Republican party.

Mims' great-grandfather, Sam Mims Jr., was a (Democratic) Mississippi state senator.

He was married to the former Amanda Ashley Legg at Centenary United Methodist Church in McComb on September 7, 1996. They have two daughters and one son, named Sam VI.

On Tuesday, July 7, 2020 Mims, who chairs the House Public Health Committee, announced that he had tested positive for COVID-19.

References

1972 births
Living people
Republican Party members of the Mississippi House of Representatives
21st-century American politicians